The Gasworks Clauses Act 1847 (10 & 11 Vict. Chapter 15) is an Act of the Parliament of the United Kingdom which consolidated the law concerning the authorisation of gasworks.

Background 
A plethora of Acts of Parliament concerning gasworks had been enacted since the start of the commercial operations in the 1800s and 1810s. The 1847 Act aimed to consolidate the provisions of all these Acts into a single overarching Act. In 1847 a government commission was established to examine the system of gas supply. It concluded that there was seldom a benefit to the consumer of limited competition between undertakings. The 1847 Act limited company dividends to ten percent. The Act codified the rights and obligations of gas undertakings and regulated dividends and prices.

Gasworks Clauses Act 1847 
The Gasworks Clauses Act 1847 received Royal Assent on 23 April 1847. Its long title is ‘An Act for consolidating in one Act certain provisions usually contained in Acts authorizing the making of Gasworks for supplying towns with Gas’.

Provisions 
The Act comprises 50 Sections:

 Section 1: Incorporation with special Act. Gasworks authorised by any Act of Parliament 
 Section 2: Interpretation. Acts authorising the construction of gasworks.
 Section 3: Interpretations. Definitions.
 Section 4: Short title of this Act.
 Section 5: Incorporation of parts of this Act with other Acts.
 Section 6: Power break up streets, etc. under superintendence, and to open drains, and to lay pipes, make sewers, erect lamps, etc.
 Section 7: Undertakers not to enter on private land without consent.
 Section 8: Notice to be served on persons having control, etc. before breaking up streets or opening drains.
 Section 9: Streets or drains not to be broken up except under superintendence of persons having control of the same.
 Section 10: Streets, etc. broken up to be reinstated without delay. Roads, etc. to be fenced and lighted while opened; and to be kept in repair for a certain time afterwards.
 Section 11: Penalty for delay in reinstating streets, etc.
 Section 12: In case of delay, persons having control of streets, etc. may reinstate them.
 Section 13: Power of the undertakers to contract for lighting buildings, streets, etc.
 Section 14: Power to undertakers to let meters and fittings. Meters, etc. not liable to distraint for rent, ec.
 Section 15: Undertakers may enter buildings for ascertaining quantities of gas consumed. Penalty for obstructing them.
 Section 16: If rent is not paid, gas may be cut off, and rent and expenses recovered.
 Section 17: Power to take away pipes, etc. when supply of gas discontinued. Undue use of gas.
 Section 18: Penalty for fraudulently using the gas of the undertakers.
 Section 19: Penalty for wilfully removing or damaging pipes, etc.
 Section 20: Satisfaction for accidentally damaging pipes, etc.
 Section 21: Penalty on undertakers allowing washings, etc. produced in making gas to flow into streams, reservoirs, etc.
 Section 22: Penalty to be sued for in superior court within six months.
 Section 23: Daily penalty during the continuance of the offence.
 Section 24: Daily penalty during escape of gas after notice.
 Section 25: Penalty for fouling water by gas.
 Section 26: Power to open ground and examine gas pipes, to ascertain whether water is fouled by gas. Ground, etc. to be reinstated.
 Section 27: Expenses to abide result of examination.
 Section 28: How expenses shall be ascertained and recovered.
 Section 29: Nothing to exempt undertakers from being indicted for a nuisance.
 Section 30: Profits of the undertakers limited.
 Section 31: If profits exceed the amount limited, excess to be invested and form a reserved fund.
 Section 32: Reserved fund not to be resorted to meet an extraordinary claim, except on certificate.
 Section 33: When fund amounts to prescribed sum, interest to be applied to purposes of the undertaking.
 Section 34: If profits are less than the prescribed rate, deficiency may be supplied from the reserved fund.
 Section 35: If profits are more than the amount prescribed, rateable reduction to be made in the price of gas.
 Section 36: Court may order petitioner to pay costs of groundless petition.
 Section 37: Penalty on undertakers for refusing to produce books, vouchers, etc.
 Section 38: Annual account to be made up by undertakers.
 Section 39: Recovery of damages.
 Section 40: Railways Clauses Acts, as to damages, etc. to be incorporated with this and the special Act.
 Section 41: repealed by Statute Law Revision Act 1875 (38 & 39 Vict. c. 66.)
 Section 42: Acts which may be done by one magistrate.
 Section 43: Penalties, etc. within metropolitan police district.
 Section 44: Persons giving false evidence liable to penalties of perjury.
 Section 45: Copies of special Act. Parliamentary Documents Deposit Act 1837 (7 Will. 4. & 1 Vict. c. 83.)
 Section 46: Penalty on undertakers failing to keep or deposit such copies.
 Section 47: Saving as to Metropolitan Paving Act (57 Geo. 3. c. xxix.), etc.
 Section 48: Saving as to rights of the crown.
 Section 49: Saving as to future Acts.
 Section 50: repealed by Statute Law Revision Act 1875 (38 & 39 Vict. c. 66.)

Amendments 
The Act was amended by the Gasworks Clauses Act 1871 (34 & 35 Vict. c. 41.)

The Act was repealed by the Gas Act 1948 (1948 c. 67).

See also 
 Oil and gas industry in the United Kingdom

References 

United Kingdom Acts of Parliament 1847